Avatar: Frontiers of Pandora is an upcoming open-world action-adventure video game based on James Cameron's Avatar film series. The game is being developed by Massive Entertainment and will be published by Ubisoft for PlayStation 5, Windows, and Xbox Series X/S in the 2023–2024 fiscal year.

Premise 
Players take control of the Na'vi and embark on a journey across the Western Frontier, a never before seen region of Pandora, and must push back the forces of the RDA, who seek to threaten it.

Development 
The game was first announced in March 2017 when Massive announced that their next major title would be based on James Cameron's Avatar. In a 2021 investor call, it was revealed that the game was tentatively set to release in the 2022–2023 fiscal year (April 2022 to March 2023). The game was titled Avatar: Frontiers of Pandora with a trailer at E3 2021 and announced for a release in 2022. The game is set to tell a standalone story within the Avatar universe.

The game was delayed in July 2022 from its initial 2022 release window to the 2023–2024 fiscal year (April 2023 to March 2024).

Notes

References

External links 
 

Upcoming video games
Action-adventure games
Avatar (franchise) mass media
Cancelled PlayStation 4 games
Cancelled Stadia games
Cancelled Xbox One games
First-person video games
Massive Entertainment games
Multiplayer and single-player video games
Open-world video games
PlayStation 5 games
Ubisoft games
Windows games
Video games about extraterrestrial life
Video games developed in Sweden
Video games set in forests
Video games set in the 22nd century
Video games set on fictional moons
Xbox Series X and Series S games